Low density lipoprotein receptor-related protein 2 also known as LRP-2 or megalin is a protein which in humans is encoded by the LRP2 gene.

Function 

LRP2 was identified as the antigen of rat experimental membranous nephropathy (Heyman nephritis) and originally named gp330  and subsequently megalin and later LRP2. LRP2/megalin is a multiligand binding receptor found in the plasma membrane of many absorptive epithelial cells.  LRP2/megalin is a member of a family of receptors with structural similarities to the low density lipoprotein receptor (LDLR). LRP2/megalin functions to mediate endocytosis of ligands leading to degradation in lysosomes or transcytosis. LRP2/megalin can also form complexes with cubilin: those complexes are able to reabsorb several molecules and can be inhibited by sodium maleate. LRP2 is expressed in epithelial cells of the thyroid (thyrocytes), where it can serve as a receptor for the protein thyroglobulin (Tg).

Clinical significance 
Mutations in the LRP2 gene are associated with Donnai-Barrow syndrome.

Interactions 

LRP2 has been shown to interact with:
 DAB2, 
 DLG4, 
 GIPC1,
 ITGB1BP1, 
 LDL-receptor-related protein associated protein, 
 LDLRAP1, 
 MAGI1, 
 MAPK8IP1, 
 MAPK8IP2, 
 NOS1AP,  and
 SYNJ2BP.

References

Further reading

External links 
 GeneReviews/NCBI/NIH/UW entry on Donnai-Barrow Syndrome